State Route 541 (SR 541) is a  state highway in central Ohio. The route's western terminus is US 62 in Martinsburg and its eastern terminus is at exit 54 of I-77 in Liberty Township.

History
SR 541 came about due to the renumbering of what was State Route 271. In 1962, the Ohio Department of Transportation (ODOT) renumbered state highways that shared numbers with proposed Interstate Highways in the state; in this case, the highway shared a number with Interstate 271, a proposed highway in the Cleveland area.

SR 271 was first designated in 1932 on a route between Coshocton and North Salem at US 21, a route formerly occupied by SR 95. By 1935, SR 271 took over the entire alignment of what was SR 309 between Coshocton and Tunnel Hill, local roads, and SR 206 between Martinsburg and New Guilford. In 1937, the route was extended east to the community of Birmingham. Between 1967 and 1969, with the completion of I-77, the eastern terminus of what was now the renumbered SR 541 was moved back to the North Salem area, but this time at an interchange with the newly built I-77.

Major intersections

References

541
Transportation in Knox County, Ohio
Transportation in Coshocton County, Ohio
Transportation in Guernsey County, Ohio